Walker Ridge is a high mountain ridge between Stafford Glacier and Coral Sea Glacier in the Victory Mountains of Victoria Land. It was mapped by the U.S. Geological Survey from surveys and from U.S. Navy air photos, 1960–64, and named by the Advisory Committee on Antarctic Names for Dr. Eric A. Walker, president of Pennsylvania State University and president of the National Academy of Engineering. He was a member of the National Science Board from 1960–64 and chairman from 1964–66.

References
 

Ridges of Victoria Land
Borchgrevink Coast